Michael Angelo Q. Miranda Sr. (born December 12, 1990) is a Filipino professional basketball player for the NLEX Road Warriors of the Philippine Basketball Association (PBA). He was selected 21st overall by Barako Bull Energy in the 2015 PBA draft.

PBA career statistics

As of the end of 2022–23 season

Season-by-season averages

|-
| align=left rowspan=2| 
| align=left | Barako Bull
| rowspan=2|20 || rowspan=2|7.7 || rowspan=2|.409 || rowspan=2|.200 || rowspan=2|.700 || rowspan=2|1.9 || rowspan=2|.2 || rowspan=2|.1 || rowspan=2|.1 || rowspan=2|2.3
|-
| align=left | Phoenix
|-
| align=left | 
| align=left | Phoenix
| 22 || 5.7 || .394 || .222 || .625 || 1.2 || .2 || .1 || .1 || 1.5
|-
| align=left | 
| align=left | NLEX
| 38 || 19.4 || .439 || .330 || .697 || 3.7 || .7 || .3 || .4 || 6.6
|-
| align=left rowspan=2| 
| align=left | TNT
| rowspan=2|24 || rowspan=2|14.2 || rowspan=2|.278 || rowspan=2|.103 || rowspan=2|.833 || rowspan=2|2.2 || rowspan=2|.6 || rowspan=2|.2 || rowspan=2|.0 || rowspan=2|2.6
|-
| align=left | NLEX
|-
| align=left | 
| align=left | NLEX
| 11 || 17.7 || .500 || .444 || .727 || 4.4 || 1.0 || .2 || .2 || 6.7
|-
| align=left | 
| align=left | NLEX
| 19 || 17.7 || .382 || .389 || .636 || 3.9 || 1.1 || .2 || .2 || 4.7
|-
| align=left | 
| align=left | NLEX
| 29 || 13.7 || .284 || .267 || .778 || 2.2 || .8 || .2 || .0 || 2.8
|-class=sortbottom
| align=center colspan=2 | Career
| 163 || 14.0 || .384 || .287 || .705 || 2.7 || .6 || .2 || .2 || 3.9

References

1990 births
Living people
Barako Bull Energy players
Basketball players from Pampanga
Kapampangan people
Centers (basketball)
San Sebastian Stags basketball players
NLEX Road Warriors players
Phoenix Super LPG Fuel Masters players
Power forwards (basketball)
TNT Tropang Giga players
Barako Bull Energy draft picks
Filipino men's basketball players